Camillo Cybo Malaspina (April 25, 1681 in Massa Carrara – January 12, 1743 in Rome) was an Italian cardinal of the Catholic Church.

Early life
Born into the aristocratic Cybo Malaspina family, he was the son of Carlo II Cybo, duke of Massa, who was a descendant of Pope Innocent VIII and Teresa Pamfili. Cybo was great grand nephew of Pope Innocent X, and nephew of Cardinal Benedetto Pamphili.

Ecclesiastical career

 1705 — Ordained as Priest
 1718 — Appointed as Titular Patriarch of Constantinople. He was ordained Bishop that same year, and named Auditor general of the Apostolic Chamber.
 1729 — Elevated to Cardinal Santo Stefano al Monte Celio in the Consistory of March 23, under Benedict XIII.
 1731 — Appointed Cardinal-Priest of Santa Maria del Popolo
 1741 — Appointed Protector of Santa Maria degli Angeli

Patronage of the arts
As many important figures of the time, Cybo was a patron of the arts. One of his proteges was Pietro Locatelli, who dedicated his Concerti Grossi Op 1 to him in 1721.

References

Bibliography
 

1681 births
1743 deaths
18th-century Italian cardinals
People from the Province of Massa-Carrara
Cybo family